Petr Vrána (born March 29, 1985) is a Czech professional ice hockey centre who currently plays for HC Oceláři Třinec of the Czech Extraliga. Selected by the New Jersey Devils in the 2003 NHL Entry Draft, he played 16 games in the National Hockey League with the Devils during the 2008–09 season. Vrána also spent four seasons in the Kontinental Hockey League. Internationally Vrána has played for the Czech national team at the junior and senior level, including at two World Championships.

Career 
Vrána is a native of Sternberk and logged his first minutes in the Czech Extraliga with HC Havirov during the 2001-02 season and moved to Canada for the following year, joining the Halifax Mooseheads in the Quebec Major Junior Hockey League. He was drafted in the second round, 42nd overall, by the New Jersey Devils in the 2003 NHL Entry Draft and signed with the Devils in May 2004. He remained with the Mooseheads until the end of the 2004-05 campaign and then gained three years of AHL experience with the Albany River Rats and the Lowell Devils. He made his NHL debut with the New Jersey Devils on October 18, 2008 against the Washington Capitals, becoming the 13th player in Devils' history to chip in with a goal in his first NHL contest: He scored against Brent Johnson with assists by Patrik Eliáš and Johnny Oduya.

Vrána returned to the Czech Republic in 2009, signing with HC Vítkovice where he would play until 2011, when he agreed to terms with Amur Khabarovsk of the Kontinental Hockey League (KHL). After spending the 2011-12 season with Amur, he moved to fellow KHL side HC Lev Praha in 2012. On July 2, 2014, Vrána left HC Lev, after it declared bankruptcy and folded, as a free agent to sign with fellow KHL club, Atlant Moscow Oblast. Later during the 2014-15 season, he transferred to another KHL team, Ak Bars Kazan.

Vrána signed with Brynäs IF of the Swedish Hockey League (SHL) for the 2015-16 campaign and left Sweden after the season to join HC Sparta Praha of the Czech Extraliga for 2016-17.

Personal life 

In 2021, Vrána's Canadian wife Lindsey drowned after falling through the ice on a lake trying to save their dog.

Career statistics

Regular season and playoffs

International

References

External links
 

1985 births
Living people
People from Šternberk
Ak Bars Kazan players
Albany River Rats players
Amur Khabarovsk players
Atlant Moscow Oblast players
Czech ice hockey centres
Halifax Mooseheads players
HC Havířov players
HC Lev Praha players
Lowell Devils players
New Jersey Devils draft picks
New Jersey Devils players
HC Oceláři Třinec players
HC Vítkovice players
Czech expatriate ice hockey players in Russia
Brynäs IF players
HC Sparta Praha players
Sportspeople from the Olomouc Region
Czech expatriate ice hockey players in Canada
Czech expatriate ice hockey players in the United States
Czech expatriate ice hockey players in Sweden